Hieut (character: ㅎ) is a consonant letter (jamo) of the Korean Hangeul alphabet. The Unicode for ㅎ is U+314E. It has two pronunciation forms, [h] at the beginning of a syllable and [t̚] at the end of a syllable. After vowels or the consonant ㄴ it is semi-silent.

It sounds as [h] in initial or (total or full) onset position (하), intervowel position (partial onset (아하) or coda with a previous vowel in the same syllable block and followed by an onset vowel from another block (아[...]아앟아) or pseudonset (앟아)) and in a coda following a consonant (받침) before an onset vowel in the next syllable (않아). It assimilates via aspiration codas before plosive consonants; if ㅎ it is a full coda (the end of the speech temporarily or finally) or batchim, it would sound [t̚] (앟 at).

Stroke order

References 

Hangul jamo